= 1950–51 Plunket Shield season =

Cricket tournament in New Zealand

1950–51 Plunket Shield
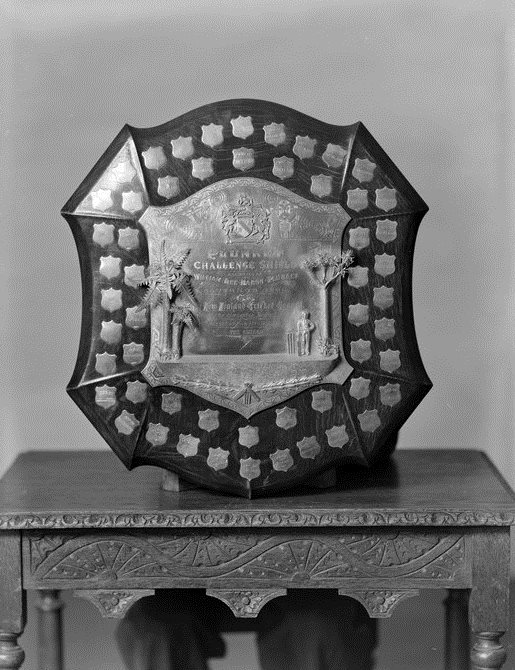
- The Plunket Shield trophy
- Cricket format: First-class
- Tournament format(s): Round-robin
- Champions: Otago (4th title)
- Participants: 5
- Matches: 10

The 1950–51 Plunket Shield season was a tournament of the Plunket Shield, the domestic first-class cricket competition of New Zealand. It was the first season featuring the Central Districts team.

Otago won the championship, finishing at the top of the points table at the end of the round-robin tournament between the five first-class sides, Auckland, Canterbury, Central Districts, Otago and Wellington. Eight points were awarded for a win, four points for having a first innings lead in a draw and two points for a first innings deficit in a draw.

== Table ==
Below are the Plunket Shield standings for the season:

Team	Played	Won	Lost	Drawn	Points	NetRpW
Otago	4	2	0	2	24	13.617
Central Districts	4	2	1	1	18	-2.616
Wellington	4	2	2	0	16	0.201
Auckland	4	1	2	1	10	-9.088
Canterbury	4	1	3	0	8	-1.281
